Hinn  are supernatural creatures, besides jinn and devils, in Arabian lore and also a group of pre-Adamitic race in Islam-related beliefs. The existence of Hinn is accepted by the Druze, along with binn, Timm, and Rimm.

Pre-Adamitic circles
According to the Alawi sect, the jinn are part of the "circle of time", belonging to a period preceding the creation of mankind. Therefore before humans, the hinn, binn, timm, rimm, jann and jinn roamed the earth. These six periods symbolize negative progress until humans emerge, thus the first letters of the first four circles mean Habtar (here referring to the personification of evil) and the latter referring to jann and jinn as subordinates of the devil. The following circle divides human history, starting with Adam and ends with Muhammad, the period in which humans now live.

Alternatively, hinn have been said to be associated with air and another creature, binn, with water in a document called "Revelations of ʻAbdullah Al-Sayid Muhammad Habib". In the same document, hinn and binn are said to be extinct, unlike jinn.

According to Ibn Kathir, the hinn belongs together with the jinn to those creatures who shed blood on earth before humankind, causing the angels to question God's command to place Adam as a viceregent. In his work Al-Bidāya wa-n-Nihāya, he relates that the Hinn and binn were exterminated by the jinn so that they could dwell on the earth. 

Although many sources describe the hinn and binn as powerful gigantic primordial creatures, Al-Jahiz mentions them as a "weak type" of demons in his Kitāb al-Ḥayawān.

Hinn fighting alongside angels

According to some accounts, the hinn supported the angels, led by Iblis during a battle against the earthen jinn, who bore disaster on the world. Tabari explained the hinn were created out of fire, like the jinn. But the hinn, who belong to Iblis' group, are created out of the fire of samum (poisonous fire), which is mentioned in the Quran (15:27) while the regular jinn are created out of marij min nar  (mixture of flame), which is mentioned in (55:15).

In folklore and poems
According to some folklore, hinn are believed to be still alive and take the shape of dogs. Based on a hadith, if a wild dog approaches a Muslim, they shall throw some food to it and chase it away, because it could have an evil soul.

Hinn were mentioned in pre-Islamic poems along with jinn.

References 

Arabian legendary creatures
Demons in Islam